Lucky Four Records was a Chicago-based record company, located at 5411 W. Diversey Avenue, that existed from 1960 to 1963.  The label was founded and owned by Lenny LaCour, who was also a singer, songwriter, and record producer.

Lucky Four Records appears to have released only 45 rpm singles; some by LaCour himself, others by such artists as The Swinging Hearts, The Belvederes, and Eddy Bell.  All Lucky Four releases are considered collectible, with #1012, "The Great Great Pumpkin", a Halloween novelty song by Eddy Bell particularly sought after.

References

See also
 List of record labels

Defunct record labels of the United States
Record labels established in 1960
Record labels disestablished in 1963